Uqi Uqini (Aymara uqi uqi a species of plant, uqi brown, grey brown, the reduplication indicates that there is a group or a complex of something, -ni a suffix to indicate ownership, "the one with the uqi uqi plant" or "the one with a complex of grey-brown color", hispanicized spelling Oke Okeni)  is a mountain in the Bolivian Andes which reaches a height of approximately . It is located in the Oruro Department, Sajama Province, Turco Municipality. Uqi Uqini lies southeast of Chunkarani.

References 

Mountains of Oruro Department